The Whale is a play written by Samuel D. Hunter. The play tells the story of a 600-pound, obese man who hides from the world and stays in his apartment. He cannot stop eating, to the detriment of everyone around him, including his estranged daughter.

Characters
 Charlie - He is above the age of 40. Paul Hodgins of the Orange County Register wrote that the author of the play "wants us to get past our initial revulsion and see Charlie's size as a manifestation of his pain."
 Liz - She is a nurse. Hodgins described her as Charlie's "enabler" as she gives him unhealthy foods despite his massive weight and her own urging of him to improve his healthcare.
 Elder Thomas
 Ellie
 Mary - The ex-wife of Charlie and the mother of Ellie. According to Hodgins, Ellie had received influences on her personality from Mary and that this is "glaringly apparent".

Production history

Origins
Created through PlayPenn, a new play development program based in Philadelphia, the play was workshopped at the Icicle Creek Theatre Festival in Leavenworth, Washington. It was given the 2011 Sky Cooper New American Play Prize at Marin Theatre Company in Mill Valley, California and was produced there in 2014. 

Hunter stated that his reflections on teaching were the initial point of inspiration for The Whale, and that he did not add the obesity aspect until later, as a way of making the teacher have a "distance" from the audience and the other characters.

According to Hunter, he made Elder Thomas a Mormon missionary as a way of "self-protection or distancing" so that he could "write about religion, but in a way that didn’t feel too close to home." Hunter stated that he used the Elder Thomas character as a "sort of unlikely connection to God."

Staging
The play had its world premiere at the Denver Center for the Performing Arts performed by the resident theatre company as part of the Colorado New Play Summit. The cast included Tom Alan Robbins as Charlie and Angela Reed as Liz. 

Davis McCallum oversaw the first off-broadway production in 2012 via Playwrights Horizons. Shuler Hensley and Rebecca Henderson starred as Charlie and Liz, respectively.

In 2013, the play was produced at South Coast Repertory with Matthew Arkin as Charlie and Blake Lindsley as Liz.

The play had its Chicago debut at the Victory Gardens Theater in 2013 with Dale Calandra as Charlie and Cheryl Graeff as Liz.

The Liz character did not have her ethnic background or race specified in the original play. As of 2022, many of the actresses portraying Liz were white. This differed from the film version, where the character, portrayed by Hong Chau, is of Asian heritage.

A play director named Davis McCallum stated that, in regards to the progression of the plot, its goal is to "turn up the pressure until it almost can’t be tolerated" and then have a "really cathartic release at the end of the piece".

Film adaptation
Hunter wrote the screenplay for the 2022 film adaptation directed by Darren Aronofsky. Aronofsky had seen the play in 2012 and wanted to adapt it into a film, but he did not move forward with the project for years, as he was unable to decide on the right actor to cast as Charlie. The Whale stars Brendan Fraser as Charlie, Hong Chau as Liz, Sadie Sink as Ellie, and Ty Simpkins as Thomas. It received polarizing reviews, but particular praise was directed toward the acting. The film was nominated for three Academy Awards at the 2023 ceremony, for Actor in a Leading Role (Fraser), Supporting Actress (Chau), and Makeup and Hairstyling- winning in Best Actor and Make Up and Hairstyling.

References

2012 plays
Plays adapted into films
Off-Broadway plays
Plays by Samuel D. Hunter